The Mataafa Storm of 1905, was a storm that occurred on the Great Lakes on November 27–28, 1905. The system moved across the Great Basin with moderate depth on November 26 and November 27, then east-northeastward across the Great Lakes on November 28. Fresh east winds were forecast for the afternoon and evening of November 27, with storm warnings in effect by the morning of November 28. Storm-force winds and heavy snows accompanied the cyclone's passage. The storm, named after the steamship , ended up destroying or damaging about 29 vessels, killing 36 seamen, and causing shipping losses of US$ 3.567 million (1905 dollars) on Lake Superior.

Weather and forecast
A storm system moving through the Great Basin on November 26 and 27 was forecast to bring "fresh easterly winds" to the Great Lakes during the afternoon and evening on November 27 by the United States Weather Bureau. At 6 p.m., winds at Duluth, Minnesota, had reached . Storm warning flags were flying by the morning of November 28 as the cyclone moved into southern Minnesota. At this time, easterly gales and heavy snows had spread across Lake Superior, Lake Huron, and Lake Erie. Five-minute winds reached  at Duluth during the early morning of November 28, before dropping below gale force by noon. The system brought heavy snows within its northern and western side across the northern Great Lakes on November 28 and November 29, with storm warnings continuing for the lower Great Lakes on the morning of November 29.

The wreck of SS Mataafa

At five o'clock in the afternoon on November 27, 1905, the bulk carrier  was on her way out of Duluth, loaded with iron ore and towing the barge James Nasmyth. She was hit by the storm, and though she struggled on for a short time, by the time she had reached Two Harbors, Minnesota, at 4:00 p.m. the next day, it was clear to her master, Captain R. F. Humble, that she could not make the run. He gave the order to turn about, and she turned her prow toward Duluth.

As she approached the port, it became clear that it was useless to try to bring both steamer and barge through the narrow Duluth Ship Canal into the harbor, so the Captain Humble gave the order to cut James Nasmyth loose. Then Mataafa attempted to make it into safe harbor alone. She made it about half-way between the twin concrete piers when a backwater surged out. Heavy water struck her stern, driving her prow down to the muddy bottom, and then slammed her stern against the north pier. Her rudder tore off and the water pulled her prow out toward the open lake, then smashed her stern against the south pier. She grounded in the shallow water outside the north pier, where she broke in two, her stern settling slowly into the water.

When the ship broke in two, twelve men were in the aft portion; three of them struggled to the forward portion. The remaining nine remained aboard the after portion and died of exposure during the night; one of the bodies in the after half had to be chopped out of solid ice. The fifteen men in the fore half fared better; although rescue attempts were futile during the stormy night, the next day a small boat made it out, and all fifteen were taken off in two boatloads.

Other shipping impact
By noon on Sunday, November 26, 1905, the steamer Butler emerged from the St. Clair River into Lake Huron. The sky was gray and overcast. For the rest of the day, Butler steamed north across Lake Huron. On the morning of Monday, November 27, the steamer 'Joseph G. Butler, Jr. passed Detour Reef Light and entered the Saint Marys River. Monday afternoon, Butler cleared the Soo Locks, just behind the steamer Bransford. That afternoon, the temperature was 28 degrees F (-2 degrees C). As the two steamers headed across Whitefish Bay, the barometer started downward, then plummeted, and the snow thickened. By dusk, the lookouts could barely make out the light at Whitefish Point as they cleared the bay into the body of Lake Superior. Here Bransford turned northward to follow the Canadian shore to stay north of the storm. Butler turned southwestward to take the shorter distance and pressed through the storm.

As Butler sighted the Caribou Island Light, the shuddering of the ship changed.  The continuous pounding of the waves on the side of the ship became interspersed with a violent shaking. Down in the engine room, the chief engineer knew that the vibration was from the propellers rising out of the water as a trough between waves running up to 10 and 20 feet (3 and 6.5 meters). First the propeller would rise out of the water, and then the spinning blades would crash back into the water. This kind of pounding could open every seam in the vessel.  It became his job to stop the blades every time they rose out of the water and get them going again once they were below the surface. If the ship were to lose headway, it would be at the mercy of the storm, but if the vibrations weren’t stopped, the ship would come apart on its own. The next obstacle was Keweenaw Point jutting out into the open lake. The steward reported that the windows were out in the mess and there was 2 feet (61 cm) of water rushing back and forth.

All day Tuesday the 28th, Butler fought the boiling seas. At one point, with land not seen and fear of approaching a point of land, Butler turned to run with the storm, hoping to clear any unseen shoreline. Late that day, the storm began to abate, and when the captain could once again see across the lake, the light at Outer Island in the Apostles was spotted. Now a new course was set to make for Duluth. The seas were still high, but the wind had let up and the snow had stopped. Some fifty hours out of Lorain, Butler was once again on a steady course for Duluth. As she came abreast of Two Harbors, Minnesota, she spotted Bransford making for Duluth. Further ahead she sighted another steamer, which turned out to be Perry G. Walker, which had sailed from Duluth just two days earlier.

Approaching Duluth, Butler sighted more freighters. James Nasmyth was anchored out from Minnesota Point, sitting low in the water with a load of iron ore and a thick coating of ice. Then Butler sighted Mataafa, sitting in the shallows of Minnesota Point and split into several parts. It was noon as Butler steamed through the canal into St. Louis Bay, sighting R. W. England lying beached on the backside of Minnesota Point, a victim of the high winds the day before.

The wrecks of November 28

Aftermath
Split Rock Lighthouse was built on Lake Superior, off Silver Bay, Minnesota, because of the storm. The Mataafa storm also spawned Vincent v. Erie, a case which has remained a staple of first year torts classes

See also
 Great Storms of the North American Great Lakes
 List of shipwrecks in 1905
 Madeira (shipwreck)

References

External links
 chroniclingamerica.loc.gov Mataafa

History of Minnesota
Great Lakes
1905 meteorology
1905 in Minnesota
1905 natural disasters in the United States
Maritime incidents in 1905
November 1905 events